Hursag  ( ḫarsang; ḪAR.SAG̃) is a Sumerian term variously translated as meaning "mountain", "hill", "foothills" or "piedmont". Thorkild Jacobsen extrapolated the translation in his later career to mean literally, "head of the valleys".
	
Mountains play a certain role in Mesopotamian mythology and Assyro-Babylonian religion, associated with deities such as Anu, Enlil, Enki and Ninhursag.

Some scholars also identify hursag with an undefined mountain range or strip of raised land outside the plain of Mesopotamia.

Dating to the third millennium BCE, tablets found at the ancient Sumerian city of Nippur, are very clear about where the ancient Sumerian God spawned. According to the tablets , on the mountain of heaven and earth , Anu spawned the Anunnaki God's. 

'Hursag' meaning ''Mountain'' or ''Hill'' is the very first word on the tablet , Making it possibly the oldest surviving written word in the world .

Notes

Mesopotamian mythology
Mythological mountains
Sumerian words and phrases